Dudi Sela won the title, beating Matija Pecotić after he retired with the score at 6–1, 1–0

Seeds

Draw

Finals

Top half

Bottom half

References
 Main Draw
 Qualifying Draw

2015 ATP Challenger Tour